The 2014–15 Boise State Broncos men's basketball team represented Boise State University during the 2014–15 NCAA Division I men's basketball season. The Broncos, led by fifth year head coach Leon Rice, played their home games at Taco Bell Arena and were a member of the Mountain West Conference. They finished the season 25–9, 14–4 in Mountain West play to win a share of the Mountain West regular season championship. They advanced to the semifinals of the Mountain West tournament where they lost to Wyoming. They received an at-large bid to the NCAA tournament where they lost in the First Four, in a de facto road game, to Dayton.

On March 9, the team was ranked #25 in the AP poll, the first time in the program's history that it was nationally ranked.

Previous season
The 2013–14 Boise State Broncos finished the season with an overall record of 21–13, 9–9 in the Mountain West to finish in a tie for fifth place. In the Mountain West Conference tournament, the Broncos defeated San Jose State and Nevada to advance to the semifinals where they lost to New Mexico. They were not invited to the NIT and, citing injuries, choose not to accept an invitation to the CBI or CIT.

Players

Departures

Incoming Transfers

Recruiting

Roster

Schedule

|-
!colspan=9 style="background:#143D99; color:#F1632A;"| Exhibition

|-
!colspan=9 style="background:#143D99; color:#F1632A;"| Regular season

|-
!colspan=9 style="background:#143D99; color:#F1632A;"| Mountain West tournament

|-
!colspan=9 style="background:#143D99; color:#F1632A;"| NCAA tournament

Season highs

Season statistics

Season milestones & awards
The 2014–15 season saw several firsts and records. The 14 conference wins is the most conference wins in school history. Their eight-game conference winning streak set a school record for consecutive conference wins. On March 9, the Broncos were ranked #25 in the AP poll marking the first time the program had ever been ranked in a major poll. Leon Rice was named the USBWA District VIII coach of the year and Derrick Marks was named to the all-district team.

MW awards
Player of the year: Derrick Marks

Newcomer of the year: James Webb III

Coach of the year: Leon Rice

Mountain West 1st team: Derrick Marks

Mountain West 2nd team: James Webb III

References

Boise State Broncos men's basketball seasons
Boise State
Boise State
Boise
Boise